Maloderbetovsky District (Bağ Dörvdä rayon) is an administrative and municipal district (raion), one of the thirteen in the Republic of Kalmykia, Russia. It is located in the north of the republic. Its administrative center is the rural locality (a selo) of Malye Derbety. As of the 2010 Census, the total population of the district was 10,528, with the population of Malye Derbety accounting for 61.1% of that number.

History
The district was established on December 11,1970.

Administrative and municipal status
Within the framework of administrative divisions, Maloderbetovsky District is one of the thirteen in the Republic of Kalmykia. The district is divided into six rural administrations which comprise ten rural localities. As a municipal division, the district is incorporated as Maloderbetovsky Municipal District. Its six rural administrations are incorporated as six rural settlements within the municipal district. The selo of Malye Derbety serves as the administrative center of both the administrative and municipal district.

Natural resources
The area has substantial bischofite deposits.

Rabid wolves
In 2003, rabid wolves were reported in the district.

References

Notes

Sources

Districts of Kalmykia
 
States and territories established in 1970
1970 establishments in Russia